Henk Bos (born 12 November 1992) is a Dutch footballer who plays as an attacking midfielder, most recently for Emmen.

Club career
Bos formerly played for FC Groningen and joined Emmen in 2016.

References

External links
 
 

1992 births
Living people
People from Stadskanaal
Dutch footballers
Association football forwards
FC Groningen players
FC Emmen players
Eredivisie players
Eerste Divisie players
Footballers from Groningen (province)